Francesc Granell i Trías (7 May 1944 – 30 August 2022) was a Spanish economist and academic. He was a Professor of Applied Economics at the University of Barcelona. As a public servant, Granell held governmental positions in Catalonia, Spain, and the European Community.

Books 
 El Mercado de Sudáfrica (Barcelona, Cámara de Industria, 1967)
 Espanya i el Mercat Comú: Aventatges i inconvenients (Gerona, Cámara de Comercio, 1970)
 Export Promotion by Private Sector Organizations (Geneva, International Trade Centre UNCTAD/GATT, 1971)
 La Exportación y los Mercados Internacionales (Barcelona, Editorial Hispano-Europea, 6th ed., 1971)
 Las empresas multinacionales y el desarrollo (Barcelona, Ed. Ariel, 1974)
 Las inversiones españolas en el exterior (Barcelona, Cámara de Comercio, 1974)
 La opción europea para la Economía española (with Profs. Muns and Ortega, Madrid, Guadiana, 1974)
 Guía Práctica de Mercados Exteriores (Barcelona, Cámara Oficial de Comercio, Industria y Navegación, 1977)
 Brasil y la cooperación económica latinoamericana (Barcelona, Instituto de Economía Americana, 1979)
 La opción CEE para la economía de Canarias (Las Palmas, Cámara de Comercio de las Palmas, 1979)
 La Ayuda española a los países en desarrollo (Universidad de Barcelona, 1980)
 Las Comunidades autónomas frente a su Comercio Exterior y a la integración en las Comunidades Europeas (editor, Universidad de Sevilla, 1981)
 Política Comercial y Comercio Exterior de España (Barcelona, Orbis, 1986)
 Cataluña, sus relaciones económicas transnacionales y la CEE (Barcelona, Vicens Vives, 1986)
 España y las Organizaciones Económicas Internacionales (Enciclopedia de la Economía Española y CEE, Ed. Orbis)
 La Catalogne (Paris, Presses Universitaires de France, 1988)
 Guía Comunidad Europea (Barcelona, TISA, 1989)
 El Debate Librecambio-Protección a finales del siglo XX, (Barcelona, Real Academia de Ciencias Económicas y Financieras,  1995)
 Catalunya dins la Unió Europea (with V. Pou and M.A. Sánchez, editors, Barcelona, Edicions 62, 2002)
 La Coopération au développement de la Communauté Européenne, Bruxelles, Université Libre, Collection Le Droit de la CE et de l'Union Européenne, 2nd ed., 2005)

References

External links

1944 births
2022 deaths
Spanish economists
People from Barcelona